Electron Sheep is a South Korean Folktronica band consisting of members Lee Jong-beom, Yoo Jeong-mok, Ryuji and Jeon Sol-ki.

Career 
Electron Sheep emerged in 2001 as a Lee Jong-beom's solo project. Their name was inspired by Philip K. Dick's science fiction Do Androids Dream of Electric Sheep?. Electron Sheep released his first studio album, Day Is Far Too Long, on August 25, 2001. On 2007, Electron Sheep released second studio album Woods(숲).

On 2015, Electron Sheep reestablished by group, consisted of Yoo Jeong-mok, Ryuji and Jeon Sol-ki. The band released their new extended play King Of Noise (소음의 왕) on September 30, 2015  On 2017, Electron Sheep released third studio album Dungeon (던전).

Discography 
Studio albums
Day Is Far Too Long (2001)
Woods (숲) (2007)
Dungeon (던전) (2017)

Extended play
King of Noise (소음의 왕) (2015)

References

South Korean indie rock groups
Musical groups established in 2001
South Korean folk rock musicians